is a 2000 shooter video game. It is a direct sequel to Silpheed. It was developed by Treasure and Game Arts, and published in North America by Working Designs. The game is a vertical scrolling shooter in which the player controls 019, a Silpheed of the planet Solont's SA-77 Squadron, as it takes on countless alien enemies.

Gameplay

Silpheed: The Lost Planet is a vertical-scrolling shooter presented at an oblique angle view. The plot takes place 31 years after the events of the first game, where most human colonies in the Solar System have been destroyed by an alien civilization named the UTOO. To prevent the UTOO from destroying the remaining colonies, as well as other celestial bodies within the universe, a squadron of starfighters known as Silpheeds are deployed to destroy the UTOO and restore peace to the universe.

The player controls one of these Silpheed ships throughout eight stages. The objective of each is to make it to the end by destroying formations of enemies and avoiding collision with them and their projectiles. At the beginning of a level, the player can customize their Silpheed with different types of weapons, including short-ranged bombs, a double shot, and a laser that pierces through enemies. These weapons can be attached to either wing of the Silpheed, allowing for one side to have one weapon and the other side to have a different one. Brief "refueling" segments midway through levels allow players to swap their weapon types. Destroying enemies close to the player increases the score multiplier, referred to as "proximity scoring", and increases the closer the player is to an enemy.

Release
The game was released in Japan on September 21, 2000 for the PlayStation 2.

North American publisher Working Designs made changes to the game. Support for analog control and vibration functionality was added. The slowdown from the Japanese version was almost completely eliminated as well. The game's Western packaging also features a foil-embossed, reflective cover. Originally, it had been scheduled for October 26, 2000, but it had been delayed to November 24 first, before delaying it further to April 2001.

Reception

The game received "average" reviews according to the review aggregation website Metacritic. Blake Fischer of NextGen said in an early review that the game had "got the look, but it's lacking the inspiration that makes a shooter stand out". In Japan, Famitsu gave it a score of 29 out of 40.

Notes

References

External links
 

2000 video games
Capcom games
Game Arts games
PlayStation 2 games
PlayStation 2-only games
Single-player video games
Swing! Entertainment games
Treasure (company) games
Vertically scrolling shooters
Video game sequels
Video games developed in Japan
Video games set on fictional planets
Working Designs